Karen Clarke may refer to:

Karen Clarke (Australian athlete) (born 1990), Australian track and field thrower at the 2010 Oceania Athletics Championships
Karen Clarke (netball) (born 1972), Australian netball player
Karen Clarke (sprinter) (born 1971), Canadian track and field sprinter